The 2015 Empire Slovak Open was a professional tennis tournament played on outdoor clay courts. It was the seventh edition of the tournament and part of the 2015 ITF Women's Circuit, offering a total of $100,000 in prize money. It took place in Trnava, Slovakia, on 4–10 May 2015.

Singles main draw entrants

Seeds 

 1 Rankings as of 27 April 2015

Other entrants 
The following players received wildcards into the singles main draw:
  Anhelina Kalinina
  Tereza Mihalíková
  Kristína Schmiedlová
  Natália Vajdová

The following players received entry from the qualifying draw:
  Jana Fett
  Lenka Juríková
  Adrijana Lekaj
  Rebecca Šramková

The following player received entry from a protected ranking:
  Victoria Kan

Champions

Singles

 Danka Kovinić def.  Margarita Gasparyan, 7–5, 6–3

Doubles

 Yuliya Beygelzimer /  Margarita Gasparyan def.  Aleksandra Krunić /  Petra Martić, 6–3, 6–2

References

External links 
 2015 Empire Slovak Open at ITFtennis.com
 Official website

2015 ITF Women's Circuit
2015
2015
2015 in Slovak tennis